Dorsifulcrum cephalotes is a moth of the family Geometridae first described by Francis Walker in 1869. It is found in Angola, Cameroon, the Central African Republic, the Democratic Republic of the Congo, Gabon, Ghana, Guinea, Ivory Coast, Nigeria and Rwanda.

References

Ennominae
Moths of Africa
Insects of the Democratic Republic of the Congo
Fauna of the Republic of the Congo
Moths described in 1869
Taxa named by Francis Walker (entomologist)